State and official visits to the United States are formal visits by the head of state (state visit) or chief of government (official visit) from one country to the United States, during which the president of the United States acts as official host of the visitor. State visits are considered to be the highest expression of friendly bilateral relations between the United States and a foreign state and are, in general, characterized by an emphasis on official public ceremonies.

The first visit of a foreign state to the United States was the state visit of the then-independent Kingdom of Hawaii in 1874; this was followed by the state visit of Brazil in 1876. Since then, numerous heads of state and government have been formally received by the President of the United States in Washington. In addition to, and more frequently than, state and official visits, the United States also receives foreign dignitaries on official working visits, which are primarily functional trips that occur with less or no ceremony.

Background

Terminology

State visits are visits to the United States led by a foreign head of state acting in his or her sovereign capacity. They are, therefore, described as a "visit of [name of state]".  State visits can only occur on the invitation of the president of the United States, acting in his capacity as head of the United States. Official visits, in contrast, are usually visits by the chief of government of a foreign state. Like state visits, they can only occur on the invitation of the president of the United States, though are offered in the president's capacity as chief of the federal government of the United States. The visit of a crown prince may also be classified as an official visit. Both state and official visits generally consist of a four-day stay in Washington by the visitor, during which a range of welcoming ceremonies are performed. They are often followed by a tour.

State visits to the United States are always reciprocated, at a later time, with a state visit by the United States. In addition, U.S. diplomatic policy is to host no more than one state visit from any single nation in a four-year period. Because of these rules, some visits of foreign states with executive presidents may be classified as official visits, instead of state visits.

There are, in addition, working visits and official working visits, which are of a largely functional nature and done to conduct business, such as negotiations, consultations, or treaty signings.

Private visits are visits of a head of state or chief of government to the United States for personal reasons, such as a holiday or for medical treatment.

History and purpose
 
Due, perhaps, to the geographic isolation of the United States, the first visit by a foreign head of state did not occur until nearly one hundred years after independence, when King Kalākaua of the Kingdom of Hawaii came to the U.S. during December 1874. This was followed, two years later, with a visit by Emperor Dom Pedro II of the Empire of Brazil.

State and official visits have sometimes been controversial. A discussed 1995 state visit by China, for example, never materialized after the administration of Bill Clinton decided it was unwilling to face the criticism from Congress and others that such an invitation would prompt. President Clinton extended a private invitation to Jiang Zemin for a less formal meeting at the White House, but the Chinese government (represented by Foreign Minister Qian Qichen) declined, "based not on any substantive disagreement, but on China's insistence that Mr. Jiang deserved a formal state." Jiang did meet with Clinton at the United Nations General Assembly in New York in October 1995, but there was no Chinese state visit to the U.S. until 1997.

Declining or canceling an invitation to a state or official visit can be interpreted as a rebuke of the United States on the international stage. In 1986, for instance, Hassan II of Morocco canceled a visit to Washington, D.C. Though the Moroccan government cited the king's personal fatigue as the reason, the cancellation was widely perceived as an expression of irritation with the U.S.' criticism over Moroccan relations with Gaddafi's Libya. In 2013, Brazilian President Dilma Rousseff canceled a planned state visit to the United States after revelations that the U.S. National Security Agency had spied on her communications and the communications of other Brazilian government officials.

Ceremonial activities

A wide variety of ceremonial activities occur during visits to the United States. The specific order of occurrence will vary based on the visitor's itinerary and is determined in advance during pre-visit negotiations between protocol officials of the United States and the visiting state. However, the activities allowed and the form they take proceed generally according to a schedule that accounts for the visitor's rank and the nature of the visit.

Flight line ceremony
A visiting head of state or chief of government will typically arrive, via aircraft, at Joint Base Andrews. When the visitor's aircraft has completed taxiing, a ground crew will move air stairs into position at the aircraft's door and unroll a red carpet. A military cordon, consisting of an approximately equal number of personnel from the 3rd United States Infantry Regiment, the U.S. Navy Ceremonial Guard, the U.S. Coast Guard Ceremonial Honor Guard, and the U.S. Air Force Honor Guard will form, flanking either side of the red carpet. For visiting heads-of-state the cordon will consist of 21-personnel, for chiefs of government, nineteen. In front of the cordon, closer to the aircraft stairs, a welcoming committee will form in a line. Two officers from the Joint Colour Guard will hold sticks attached to the flag of the United States and the flag of the visiting country. The 
welcoming committee consists of the United States Chief of Protocol, the United States ambassador to the visiting state, the visiting state's ambassador to the United States, the commanding general of Joint Base Andrews, and two or three prominent personages designated by the Chief of Protocol. 

As the visitor walks down the air stairs, the U.S. Air Force Band performs "Arrival Fanfare Number One". At the bottom of the stairs, he or she will be greeted by an American schoolchild with a bouquet of flowers before being introduced to the welcoming committee by the chief of protocol. The national anthems of the visiting state and the United States will be performed prior to the visitor's departure, by car, to the President's Guest House (or other accommodations).

Arrival ceremony

For state and official visits, a formal arrival ceremony will typically be hosted by the president on the South Lawn of the White House the morning after the dignitary arrives in the United States. The arrival ceremony was only added to the program of the state visit in the 1940s. The Chief Usher of the White House is principally responsible for arrangements of the arrival ceremony.

The arrival ceremony is conducted by a civilian welcoming committee, as well as a large number of military personnel drawn from the 3rd U.S. Infantry Regiment, the U.S. Navy Ceremonial Guard, the U.S. Air Force Honor Guard, the U.S. Coast Guard Ceremonial Honor Guard, the White House sentries, Alpha Company of the garrison of Marine Barracks Washington, and selected other personnel.

For official working visits, a different arrival ceremony will be held at the parade ground of the Pentagon, instead of the South Lawn of the White House. The presiding official of this form of arrival ceremony is the United States Secretary of Defense instead of the president.

During the White House arrival ceremony Presidential Salute Battery fires cannon volleys from a firing position in President's Park during the performance of the visiting state's national anthem.

Order of events for a White House arrival

Blair House
During state and official visits, the visitor will be invited to use the President's Guest House (also known as Blair House), a 119-room home across the street from the White House. During the residence of a foreign dignitary, the dignitary's official standard is displayed on the building's flagpole. In cases of dignitaries who do not have official standards, the respective nation's flag is displayed instead. On occasions where two or more foreign visitors of equal rank are visiting Washington, neither are invited to stay at the President's Guest House. The policy is in place to avoid the perception of favoritism.

Some visiting dignitaries with whom the sitting president has a personal relationship have been invited to stay in the guest quarters at the White House, a suite of rooms in the southeast corner of the second floor of that building that includes the Lincoln Bedroom and Queens' Bedroom, plus their adjoining sitting rooms, dressing rooms and bathrooms. These are separated from the president's apartments by a staircase landing. During the presidency of Bill Clinton, Queen Sonja and John Major both stayed in the White House guest quarters, instead of the President's Guest House.

Department of State luncheon

Official and official working visits, as well as some state visits led by an executive president, generally include a luncheon at Foggy Bottom, which will be jointly hosted by the Vice President of the United States and the United States Secretary of State; the president of the United States does not attend. Luncheons typically follow the White House or Pentagon arrival ceremony and are held in the Benjamin Franklin State Dining Room. They are served in three courses.

State dinner
 
A dinner at the White House is held in the evening after the White House arrival ceremony in the case of state and official visits. Dinners are appropriately referred to as state dinners whether or not they occur during a state or official visit; the name, in this case, refers to the rank of the host of the dinner (the president of the United States), not the visitor.

The dress code for state dinners is determined in advance by the White House Social Secretary in consultation with the Office of the First Lady of the United States. Black tie or mess dress is usually prescribed for state dinners during official visits, while state dinners during state visits may be either black tie or mess dress, or white tie with decorations or mess dress. The president of the United States has not customarily worn decorations, with some exceptions as in cases where he has been invested into an order of the visiting state. Where applicable, visitors may wear national costume instead of evening dress.    Visitors from socialist states, including Nikita Khrushchev and Hu Jintao, have, in the past, refused to wear evening dress.

Dinners are typically held in the State Dining Room. Those for which guests exceeding the capacity of the room have been invited may overflow into the adjoining Red Room.  On some occasions, weather permitting, the dinner is held outdoors, such as during the official visit of Chancellor Ludwig Erhard in 1964 or the state visit of the United Kingdom in 1976.

Guests at White House state dinners are seated at ten-person round tables. The practice of using a large number of round tables, instead of one or a few long banquet tables, was initiated by Jacqueline Kennedy.

Order of events for a state dinner

Return dinner

The evening following the state or official dinner, it is customary for the visitor to host a return dinner at the chancery of his or her embassy in Washington. In general, during state visits the president and first lady will attend the return dinner. During official visits, only the Vice-President of the United States and their spouse will attend, though this custom is not one strictly observed and the president has attended return dinners during official visits, in addition to state visits.

Address to the Congress
The day following the state dinner, the visiting head of state or chief of government will often be invited to address a joint meeting of the Senate of the United States and the House of Representatives of the United States. As the parliamentary procedure for initiating a joint session is complex, a joint meeting is usually held instead. (No foreign head of state or chief of government has ever addressed a joint session of Congress, although in 1934 French ambassador André Lefebvre de La Boulaye addressed a joint session to memorialize the centennial of the death of the Marquis de Lafayette.)

Streetlining
Beginning the day before the arrival of the visitor, and continuing through their stay, lamp posts on Pennsylvania Avenue will be outfitted with the visiting state's flag, as well as that of the United States and the District of Columbia. The flag of the visiting state will also be displayed over the East Executive Avenue entrance to the Eisenhower Executive Building.

Non-ceremonial activities

Visits to historic sites
On some state visits, foreign leaders have visited Mount Vernon, the Virginia home of George Washington. In 1944, General Charles de Gaulle, then the leader of the Free French Forces, traveled to the United States. The trip was treated by President Franklin D. Roosevelt as "something less than a state visit" but still featured "a schedule that had all the trappings of a visiting head of state"—including visits by de Gaulle to Mount Vernon and the Tomb of the Unknown Soldier at Arlington National Cemetery. A trip to Mount Vernon was also undertaken by Pakistan leader Ayub Khan in July 1961, when President John F. Kennedy hosted Khan at a state dinner at Mount Vernon. This was the first and apparently the only time in U.S. history that a state dinner has taken place outside the White House.

Many foreign heads of state over the years have also visited Monticello (the home of Thomas Jefferson) over the years, sometimes accompanied by the U.S. president and sometimes not. The first trip to Monticello by a visiting foreign head of state was made by Indonesian Prime Minister Sutan Sjahrir in September 1947.

In July 1985, Chinese President Li Xiannian traveled to the United States, the first such visit by a PRC head of state. U.S. President Ronald Reagan bid a welcome to President Li at a ceremony on the South Lawn of the White House. In 1997, Chinese Communist Party general secretary Jiang Zemin began his state visit to the United States (the second by a paramount leader of China, after Deng Xiaoping) by visiting colonial Williamsburg and then Independence Hall in Philadelphia; in 1998, President Bill Clinton reciprocated when he began his state visit to China with a trip to the Mausoleum of the First Qin Emperor, famed as the site of the Terracotta Army.

River barge cruises
In 1992, Boris Yeltsin described his cruise on the Ceremonial Barge Chesapeake with George H. W. Bush:

Tour
After four days in Washington, D.C., a visiting dignitary on a state or official visit may sometimes undertake a tour that lasts as long as ten days.

In popular culture
 In the seventh episode of first season of the television series "The West Wing", President Josiah Bartlet hosts a state dinner for the President of Indonesia
 In the third episode of the third season of the web television series House of Cards, President Frank Underwood hosts a state visit for the President of Russia.
 In the second episode of the fourth season of the HBO television series Veep, the character of Selina Meyer hosts an official visit for the prime minister of Israel.

See also
 Commander-in-Chief's Guard (3rd Infantry Regiment)
 List of heads of state and government visits to the United States
 List of United States military premier ensembles
 State funerals in the United States
 United States Army Herald Trumpets

References

External links
Visits by Foreign Leaders – catalog by the Office of the Historian, United States Department of State; lists visits by year and by country, including names of the visiting leader and a brief description of the visit

Ceremonies in the United States
Diplomacy
 
State ritual and ceremonies
Diplomatic protocol